This list of museums in South Africa is a list of museums, defined for this context as institutions (including nonprofit organisations, government entities, and private businesses) that collect and care for objects of cultural, artistic, scientific, or historical interest and make their collections or related exhibits available for public viewing. Museums that exist only in cyberspace (i.e., virtual museums) are not included.

To use the sortable tables: click on the icons at the top of each column to sort that column in alphabetical order; click again for reverse alphabetical order.

Museums

Eastern Cape

Free State

Gauteng

KwaZulu-Natal

Limpopo

Mpumalanga

North West

Northern Cape

Western Cape

See also

 List of natural history museums in South Africa
 List of museums

External links

List
Museums
South Africa
Museums
Museums
South Africa